Metarbela cymaphora is a moth in the family Cossidae. It is found in Angola, South Africa and Zimbabwe.

References

Natural History Museum Lepidoptera generic names catalog

Metarbelinae
Moths described in 1910